The North Wing Maverick is an American single-seat ultralight trike designed and produced by North Wing Design of East Wenatchee, Washington. The aircraft is supplied as a kit for amateur construction.

Design and development
It features a "top-less" strut-braced hang glider-style high-wing, weight-shift controls, a single-seat, open cockpit, tricycle landing gear and a single engine in pusher configuration.

The aircraft is made from bolted-together aluminum tubing, with its single surface wing covered in Dacron sailcloth. Its  span wing is supported by streamlined struts, in place of the more commonly used cables and kingpost. The Maverick is controlled with a conventional weight-shift "A" frame control bar. In 2008 the aircraft was improved with a  folding wing pylon and increased baggage space.

The strut-braced wing provides a number of advantages over the traditional cable braced wing, including reduced overall height for hangaring, reduced drag and improved appearance.

Older Maverick models may be brought up to Maverick 2 standards with a factory-supplied conversion kit.

Variants
Maverick 103
Maverick Mustang
Maverick 2 Legend
The empty weight of this model exceeds US ultralight category weights. Optional engines include the Kawasaki 340 and the Verner JCV-360.
Maverick 2 RT
The empty weight of this model meets US ultralight category requirements. Optional engines include the Kawasaki 340 and the Verner JCV-360.

Specifications (Maverick 103)

References

External links

Maverick
1990s United States ultralight aircraft
Homebuilt aircraft
Single-engined pusher aircraft
Ultralight trikes